Tunb-e Bozorg (also known as Greater Tumb, Jazīreh-ye Tonb-e Bozorg, Jezīrat Tunb, Tonb, Ţunb al Kubrá, and Tunb Buzurq) is a village in Tunb Rural District, Tunb District, Abumusa County, Hormozgan Province, Iran. At the 2006 census, its population was 155, in 49 families.  The village is on Greater Tunb island.

References 

Populated places in Abumusa County